Viktor Nagy (born 24 July 1984) is a Hungarian water polo goalkeeper. He took up the sport at the age of 10 at the Szolnoki Dózsa in Budapest, and made his first appearance for the Hungarian national team in 2006. He won the world title in 2013 and competed at the 2012, 2016 and 2020 Summer Olympics

Personal life
Nagy is the brother of racing driver Dániel Nagy and a great grandson of painter Tivadar Csontváry Kosztka. He is married to Blanka, and has a son Samuel and a daughter Olivia. He is right-handed.

Honours

National
 World Championships:  Gold medal - 2013;  Silver medal - 2007
 European Championship:  Gold medal - 2020;  Silver medal - 2014;  Bronze medal - 2008, 2016
 FINA World League:  Silver medal - 2007, 2013, 2014, 2018

Club
BVSC (BVSC-Brendon)
 Hungarian Cup: 2002–03
 Hungarian Super Cup: 2003

Vasas (TEVA-VasasPlaket, TEVA-Vasas-UNIQA, TEVA-Vasas)
 Hungarian Championship: 2006–07, 2007–08, 2008–09, 2009–10, 2011–12
 Hungarian Cup: 2004, 2005, 2009
 Hungarian Super Cup: 2006

Szeged (Diapolo Szeged)
 Hungarian Championship: 2012–13

Szolnok (Szolnoki Dózsa-KÖZGÉP)
 LEN Champions League: 2016–17
LEN Euro Cup: 2020–21
 LEN Super Cup: 2017
 Hungarian Championship: 2014–15, 2015–16, 2016–17, 2020–21
 Hungarian Cup: 2014, 2016, 2017
 Hungarian Super Cup: 2016, 2017

Awards
 Steinmetz János-vándordíj (Best Goalkeeper in OB I): 2007, 2008, 2010, 2012, 2015
Swimming World Magazine's man water polo ''World Player of the Year "award: 2013
 Best Goalkeeper of 2013 World Championship
 Best Goalkeeper of 2016 European Championship
 Best Goalkeeper of 2018 World League
2013 World Championship Team of the Tournament
2017 World Championship Team of the Tournament
Bes Goalkeeper of 2016–17 Final Six  LEN Champions League
Orders
   Silver Cross of the Cross of Merit of Hungary (2012)

See also
 Hungary men's Olympic water polo team records and statistics
 List of men's Olympic water polo tournament goalkeepers
 List of world champions in men's water polo
 List of World Aquatics Championships medalists in water polo

References

External links

 

1984 births
Living people
Hungarian male water polo players
Water polo goalkeepers
Water polo players at the 2012 Summer Olympics
Water polo players at the 2016 Summer Olympics
World Aquatics Championships medalists in water polo
Water polo players at the 2020 Summer Olympics
Medalists at the 2020 Summer Olympics
Olympic bronze medalists for Hungary in water polo
Water polo players from Budapest
21st-century Hungarian people